Tangtse
or Drangtse
()
is a village in the Leh district of Ladakh, India. It is located in the Durbuk tehsil. Traditionally, it was regarded as the border between the Nubra region to the north and the Pangong region to the south. It was a key halting place on the trade route between Turkestan and Tibet. It was also a site of wars between Ladakh and Tibet.

During the Jammu and Kashmir princely rule, Tangtse was the headquarters of an ilaqa (subdistrict), whose territory included the Pangong  Lake area, the Chang Chenmo Valley and the Aksai Chin plateau. Tangtse was also a key halting place on the Chang Chenmo route to Turkestan, via the Chang Chenmo Valley and Aksai Chin, which the British tried to promote for a few decades. 

Tangtse is one of the 26 constituencies of the Ladakh Autonomous Hill Development Council of the Leh district. Following the 2020 election, the Councillor for Tangste is Tashi Namgyal Yakzee, who is also in the Executive Council.

Geography

Tangtse is located at the intersection of two major strands of the Karakoram fault system, called the Tangtse fault and the Pangong fault. The two faults sandwich the Pangong Range, at the northern periphery of which lies the village of Tangtse.

The Tangtse fault is home to the Lung or Long valley, divided into three sections: Long Kongma, Long Parma and Long Yogma (the upper, middle and lower sections). In modern maps, the entire valley is labelled as Loi Yogma without any division into sections. The Tangtse River (or Lung Chu) flows through the valley, draining the western slopes of the Pangong Range as well as the eastern slopes of the Ladakh Range. It flows past  Tangtse to join the Shyok River near Durbuk.

The Pangong fault was once home to a "Pangong River" which flowed through its valley during the pleistocene. But the river has been dammed by tectonic activity and has turned into the present Pangong Lake. The valley of the erstwhile effluent of the lake now houses the Mughlib stream, which joins the Tangtse River near the village of Tangtse.
Even though the Ladakhis had no knowledge of the erstwhile "Pangong River" (it having predated the birth of humanity), they preserve a myth that the waters flowing into the Mughlib stream, from a "scanty spring at Wangtong", represent the filtered waters of the Pangong Lake.
The Ladakhis thus regard the Tangtse village lying at the northwestern end of the Pangong Lake.

Trade routes 

From Tangtse, one is able to travel to Rudok and Gartok in Tibet via a number of routes, while Tangtse is also close to the Central Asian caravan route via Durbuk and the Karakoram Pass. According to Moravian Tibetologist F. A. Peter, there is evidence of the route having been used for centuries between Turkestan and Tibet. Historian Janet Rizvi has also acknowledged that the trade route between Turkestan and Tibet passed through Ladakh.

History 

Tangtse lies at the border between the Nubra region (traditionally called Dumra) and the Pangong region. It played a key role in the two  wars between the Ladakhis and Tibetans, the Tibet–Ladakh–Mughal War (1679–1684) and the Dogra–Tibetan War (1841–1842).

Tibet-Ladakh-Mughal War 
In 1679, the Tibetan forces under the command of Galdan Chhewang fought an advance guard of Ladakhi forces in Guge (West Tibet). After defeating them, they invaded Ladakh itself.  The route taken by the Tibetans is believed to have been via Rudok, Chushul and the Lung Chu valley.
The Ladakhis joined the battle at Lung-Khung (Long Kongma) and repulsed the attack.

The following year, Tibet sent formidable reinforcements (estimated at 5,000 troops along with several seasoned commanders) and the Tibetans returned. A battle was fought at the "foot of the Chang La pass", which would again indicate the valley between Durbuk and Tangtse. Cunnigham gives the location of the final battle as Balaskya and Petech as dPal-rgyas. The Ladakhis were roundly defeated and withdrew to the fort of Basgo in northern Ladakh. After a three-year siege, they requested assistance from the Mughal forces in Kashmir, who fought off the Tibetans and chased them to the Pangong area.

Rudok and Guge, which were previously under the control of Ladakh, slipped out of Ladakhi hands. In 1684, they agreed to respect the new borders in a Treaty of Tingmosgang.

Dogra–Tibetan War 
After the defeat of the Zorawar Singh's forces in West Tibet, the Tibetans were incited by Ladakhi rebels, who wanted to overthrow the Dogras ensconced in Ladakh. Apparently to lend support to them, the Tibetan forces marched to Ladakh and camped at "Dumra".
The most likely location of this encampment is in the valley between Tangtse and Durbuk. It is reported that Lhasa dispatched additional 5,000 troops to join them here.
The Tibetan accounts say that they established a defence post at "Lung-wu" (Long Yogma), which was described as a place between "Rudok and the Pangong Lake".

The Ladakhi rebels had declared their minor king Jigmet Senge Namgyal as an independent ruler. He wrote to the Sikh emperor Sher Singh stating that he had submitted to the Chinese emperor and offered truce terms to the Sikhs. No response was received.
After the arrival of reinforcements led by Dewan Hari Chand and Wazir Ratanu, the Dogras challenged the Tibetan encampments at Tangtse and the Long Yogma valley. Skirmishes continued for several days with a loss of 300 men for the Dogras. Eventually, the Dogras employed a decisive flooding tactic, following a suggestion from a Nubra chieftain, which dislodged the Tibetans from their trenches and led to a Dogra victory.

Afterwards a 'Treaty of Chushul' was agreed by the two sides, restoring the status quo ante bellum. The Ladakhi ruler was granted privileges appropriate to his rank. Trade and diplomatic missions were restored to their traditional mode.

Tankse ilaqa 
During the Dogra rule, Tankse was the headquarters of a subdistrict (a kardari, often called an ilaqa), which controlled access to the Chang Chenmo Valley. Phobrang, Chushul, and Durbuk were under its control.

The Chang Chenmo route to Central Asia passed through Tankse, which the British attempted to promote as the main trade route between Leh and Yarkand in the late 19th century. Tankse was described as a large village with  50 houses. It had a rest house and a government supply depot. Travellers were advised to procure their supplies here, to sustain themselves till reaching Sanju, about 350 miles away.

With the eruption of the Sino-Indian border dispute in the late 1950s, the Indian government had ample documents from the time of Dogra administration to demonstrate that the Chang Chenmo Valley and the Aksai Chin plateau belonged to Ladakh.
The Kashmir state records classified these regions as part of the Tankse ilaqa and revenue records were available with regular assessments and settlements of revenue. The revenue maps showed the large stretches of uninhabited territories, which are now occupied by China, as part of the Tankse ilaqa.

Rock Art 

Tangtse is a well-known and important site of Tocharian, Sogdian, Śārāda and Arabic inscriptions. A Franco-Indian Archaeological Mission in Ladakh called the rock art at Tangste as "the most important" site for rock art in Ladakh, providing information about Ladakh towards the end of the 1st millennium AD. The mission found "about 300 petroglyphs" and "almost 70 rock inscriptions in various scripts". Some authors classify some of the signs here as tamgas. Volutes can be seen on some of the inscriptions of animals. Compositions from Ruthok and Tangtse are noted to be similar.

Demographics

According to the 2011 census of India, Tangtse has 126 households. The effective literacy rate (i.e. the literacy rate of population excluding children aged 6 and below) is 69.93%.

Infrastructure

Energy and water 

A solar power plant in Tangtse provides electricity for five hours every day to about 350 households. Previously, a government diesel generator provided electricity. The area has cellular network connectivity. The Indian Army also has renewable energy infrastructure here including a wind farm. Ground water resources have also been developed here with the help of Indian geologist Ritesh Arya.

Road 

Tangtse, in the Ladakh Range, lies on Leh-Karu-Sakti-Zingral-Tangtse-Pangong Lake motorable road. Karu, which lies on Leh-Manali NH-3, connects Tangtse to Leh and the rest of India. 

Between Zingral and Tangtse there are two motorable asphalt roads. The shorter router is through Zingral-Ke La pass-Taruk (Tharuk)-Tangtse alignment.

Advanced Landing Ground 
Parma Valley Advanced Landing Ground or Parma ALG is a proposed aerodrome located in the Parma Valley (Long Parma).

See also 

 India-China Border Roads
 Transport and tourism in Ladakh

Notes

References

Bibliography 
 
 
 
 
 
 
 
 
 
 
 
 
 
 
 

Villages in Durbuk tehsil